Muhammad Asad Ghous (born April 14, 1990) is an American cricketer of Pakistani origin who represents and plays for the United States national cricket team. a
In 2012 Ghous was selected as to be a part of the United States national cricket team at the 2012 ICC World Twenty20 Qualifier in the UAE in March 2012. In June 2021, he was selected to take part in the Minor League Cricket tournament in the United States following the players' draft.

References

1990 births
Living people
American cricketers
American sportspeople of Pakistani descent
American cricket captains
ICC Americas cricketers